Sadlno may refer to the following places in Poland:
Sadlno, Lower Silesian Voivodeship (south-west Poland)
Sadlno, Greater Poland Voivodeship (west-central Poland)
Sadlno, West Pomeranian Voivodeship (north-west Poland)